The women's long jump at the 2016 European Athletics Championships took place at the Olympic Stadium on 6 and 8 July.

Records

Schedule

Results

Qualification

Qualification: 6.60 m (Q) or best 12 performers (q)

Final

References

External links
 amsterdam2016.org, official championship site

Long Jump W
Long jump at the European Athletics Championships
2016 in women's athletics